Joseph Leopold Louis Marie Frédéric Chabot (born February 12, 1968) is a Canadian ice hockey coach and former goaltender who played parts of five seasons in the National Hockey League (NHL) for the Montreal Canadiens, Philadelphia Flyers and Los Angeles Kings. He is currently the Goaltending Coach for the Minnesota Wild.

Playing career
Chabot played for the International Hockey League's Cincinnati Cyclones. He also played for the Houston Aeros, helping them win the Turner Cup in 1999. He also played a portion of his career for the National Hockey League's Los Angeles Kings. He was also on the roster for the 1998–99 expansion Nashville Predators. He won the Aldege "Baz" Bastien Memorial Award as the best goaltender in the American Hockey League in the 1993–94 season as a member of the Hershey Bears.

Holds the record for being the NHL player most selected as part of expansion drafts tied with Darren Puppa who was drafted twice in the same year.

Coaching career
On July 6, 2009, Chabot was named the Goaltending Consultant for the Edmonton Oilers.

On November 24, 2014, Chabot was relieved of his duties as the Goaltender Consultant for the Edmonton Oilers after being replaced by Dustin Schwartz. He was shortly thereafter hired by the Minnesota Wild as their Goaltending Development Coach. On August 26, 2020, Chabot was promoted by the Wild to be their Goaltending Coach.

Awards
WHL East First All-Star Team – 1989

References

External links
 

1968 births
Adler Mannheim players
Canadian ice hockey goaltenders
Cincinnati Cyclones (IHL) players
Drummondville Voltigeurs players
Edmonton Oilers coaches
Fort Wayne Komets players
Fredericton Canadiens players
French Quebecers
Hershey Bears players
Houston Aeros (1994–2013) players
Ice hockey people from Quebec
Las Vegas Thunder players
Living people
Los Angeles Kings players
Minnesota Wild coaches
Montreal Canadiens players
Moose Jaw Warriors players
New Jersey Devils draft picks
Nürnberg Ice Tigers players
People from Saguenay–Lac-Saint-Jean
Philadelphia Flyers players
Prince Albert Raiders players
Sherbrooke Canadiens players
Vienna Capitals players
Winston-Salem Thunderbirds players
Canadian expatriate ice hockey players in Austria
Canadian expatriate ice hockey players in Germany
Canadian ice hockey coaches